Sylvester Romero Palma was the thirteenth Anglican Bishop of Belize from 1978. He resigned his See in 2005.

References

Year of birth missing (living people)
21st-century Anglican bishops in the Caribbean
Anglican bishops of Belize
Living people
Place of birth missing (living people)